Tenor is a live solo album by multi-instrumentalist and composer Joe McPhee, recorded in 1976 it was the third album released on the Swiss HatHut label and was rereleased on CD in 2000 as Tenor & Fallen Angels with a bonus track.

Reception

Allmusic reviewer Steve Loewy stated "McPhee was (and is) a master of new sounds. He trailblazes paths, unafraid of consequences, devoid of cliches. His improvisations incorporate squeaks and squeals, but also bop-like stabs and outrageously radical runs that scream for attention. McPhee has come a long way since this major recording, but this still remains one of the best solo tenor albums of avant-garde jazz". On All About Jazz writer Glen Astarita noted "Tenor & Fallen Angels is a brilliant portraiture of a musician who is sharing his sentiments, visualizations and artistic spirit for the entire world to hear! - Essential". The Penguin Guide to Jazz Recordings describes the album as “packed with rich ideas.”

Track listing 
All compositions by Joe McPhee
 "Knox" - 8:34
 "Good-Bye Tom B." - 6:34
 "Sweet Dragon" - 5:35
 "Tenor" - 23:26 
 "Fallen Angels" - 14:59 Bonus track on CD reissue

Personnel 
Joe McPhee - tenor saxophone

References 

 
Joe McPhee live albums
1977 live albums
Hathut Records live albums